"Meravigliosa creatura" is a song by Italian rock vocalist Gianna Nannini, written by Mara Redeghieri, vocalist at Ustmamò. The single was simultaneously on air at different radio networks on 1 January 1995, one minute after midnight, and it anticipates the release of the album Dispetto, expected on 13 February of the same year in all Europe. In 2004, it was featured on the album Perle with a new arrangement of the song, a new slow version with piano and chord instruments that will be finished as a last arrangement of February 2007, 3 years after the album Perlo was released. The final arrangement was chosen as the soundtrack for the Fiat Bravo spot, helping the piece to get in the charts. It was not released as a single, but the sales of the piece was mostly by internet download. Incredibly, the piece reaches the number one in charts, for the third time in the singer musical career; it had to pass 17 years until Gianna Nannini reached the singles top.

Charts

Certifications

References

External links

1995 singles
Gianna Nannini songs